Erwin Isaacs (born 21 December 1986 in Cape Town, Western Cape) is a South African association football who most recently played for Ajax Cape Town as a right back.

Isaacs is a hard working central attacking midfielder. He can also play as a second striker as well as playing on the left or right wing. He is a free-kick specialist and a clean powerful striker of the ball.

Local career
Isaacs spent nine years at Santos F.C. South Africa. During his time at Santos, Isaacs admitted to faking injuries to avoid games.

International career
He made his debut for South Africa in 2011 and has so far been capped once.

Personal
He hails from Lavender Hill, Cape Town.

External links

References

1986 births
South African soccer players
Living people
Sportspeople from Cape Town
Association football midfielders
Association football forwards
Cape Coloureds
Santos F.C. (South Africa) players
South Africa international soccer players
Bidvest Wits F.C. players
Cape Town Spurs F.C. players